Ian Hugh Boyd (born 8 December 1933) is a British middle-distance runner.

Career
He competed in the men's 1500 metres at the 1956 Summer Olympics. He represented England and won a bronze medal in the 880 yards division at the 1954 British Empire and Commonwealth Games in Vancouver, Canada.

Four years later he represented England in the 1 mile race at the 1958 British Empire and Commonwealth Games in Cardiff, Wales.

References

External links
 

1933 births
Living people
Athletes (track and field) at the 1956 Summer Olympics
British male middle-distance runners
Olympic athletes of Great Britain
Place of birth missing (living people)
Commonwealth Games medallists in athletics
Commonwealth Games bronze medallists for England
Athletes (track and field) at the 1954 British Empire and Commonwealth Games
Athletes (track and field) at the 1958 British Empire and Commonwealth Games
Medallists at the 1954 British Empire and Commonwealth Games